A Sailor's Sweetheart is a 1927 Warner Bros. silent film comedy directed by Lloyd Bacon. It stars Louise Fazenda and Clyde Cook. It was released with a Vitaphone soundtrack with a music score and sound effects.

An incomplete print exists in England at the British Film Institute (BFI)/National Film and Television Archive, London.

Cast
 Louise Fazenda as Cynthia Botts
 Clyde Cook as Sandy MacTavish
 Myrna Loy as Claudette Ralston
 William Demarest as Detective
 John Miljan as Mark Krisel
 Dorothea Wolbert as Lena Svenson
 Tom Ricketts as Professor Meekham

See also
List of early Warner Bros. sound and talking features

References

External links
 
 

1927 films
American silent feature films
Films directed by Lloyd Bacon
Warner Bros. films
American black-and-white films
1927 comedy films
Silent American comedy films
1920s American films